Ashley Wright (born 7 April 1987) is an English former professional snooker player.

Career
He qualified for the 2007/2008 Main Tour by finishing 9th in the PIOS Order of Merit.

Career finals

Amateur finals: 2

References

Living people
English snooker players
1987 births